The 2nd Cavalry Regiment was a historic cavalry regiment of the Hellenic Army.

History
The 2nd Cavalry Regiment was established in 1885, when the extant three hipparchies were reorganized and renamed into regiments of four cavalry companies each. It participated in the Greco-Turkish War of 1897 in Thessaly, as well as in the Asia Minor Campaign, where it distinguished itself in the capture of the Nea Ephesos (Kuşadası) – Sokia (Söke) area in April 1922. After the war, it remained active, garrisoned in various areas of Thessaly and Macedonia, until its disbandment in 1937.

In January 2001, the honorific title "2nd Cavalry Regiment - Ephesos" was awarded to the 25th Armoured Brigade.

References 

1885 establishments in Greece
Military units and formations established in 1885
Regiments of Greece
Cavalry regiments
Military units and formations disestablished in 1937